Jefferson Independent School District is a public school district based outside the city limit's of Jefferson, Texas.

In 2009, the school district was rated "academically acceptable" by the Texas Education Agency.

Schools
Jefferson High (Grades 9-12)
Jefferson Junior High (Grades 5-8)
Jefferson Elementary (Grades 1-4)
Jefferson Primary (Grades PK-K)

References

External links
Jefferson ISD−Independent School District website

School districts in Marion County, Texas
Jefferson, Texas